was a town located in Ibusuki District, Kagoshima Prefecture, Japan.

As of 2003, the town had an estimated population of 10,467 and the density of 281.52 persons per km2. The total area was 37.18 km2.

On January 1, 2006, Yamagawa, along with the town of Kaimon (also from Ibusuki District), was merged into the expanded city of Ibusuki and no longer exists as an independent municipality.

External links
 Official website of Ibusuki 

Dissolved municipalities of Kagoshima Prefecture
Ibusuki, Kagoshima